Kuhmo (known as Kuhmoniemi until 1937) is a town and a municipality in Finland and is located at the south-eastern corner of the Kainuu region. Neighbour towns are Hyrynsalmi, Lieksa, Nurmes, Ristijärvi, Sotkamo and Suomussalmi. A neighbour city across the Russian border is Kostomuksha. Vartius, one of the border crossing points between Finland and Russia, is located in northern Kuhmo.

Kuhmo´s eastern border is located at a drainage divider and town area belongs to drainage basin of Oulujärvi.

The municipality is unilingually Finnish.

History
The first inhabitants arrived in Kuhmo after the last ice-age, around 8000 BCE. Proof of Stone Age habitation has been found around Ontojärvi and Lammasjärvi. Sami people inhabited Kuhmo area until migration from Karelia and Savonia pushed Sami people up north. The influence of Sami culture is still found in the placenames. Wide spreading water routes are known to have attracted hunters, raiders, merchants and tax collectors since the 9th century.

In the Treaty of Nöteborg, the settlement between Sweden and the Novgorod Republic on August 12, 1323, the Kuhmo area belonged to Novgorod. Yet hunters and tax collectors kept on penetrating to the area from west. Swedish interest was to push the border further east.

Permanent habitation settled to the area after Gustav I, king of Sweden, had promised tax relief to peasants who would move north. Almost all the habitation was destroyed in the Russo-Swedish war between 1570 and 1595. In the Treaty of Teusina, the region of Kuhmo was annexed into Sweden. In the following centuries, this area was continuously raided in a number of wars and quarrels.

In 1809, Finland was annexed from Sweden to the Russian Empire as the Grand Duchy of Finland. For merchants from Karelia and Russia, Kuhmo became a trade route and a place to sell their goods. As a memorial of those merchants, on the market of Kuhmo there stands the statue “Laukunkantaja” (in English, "The Bag Bearer"). In this era, Elias Lönnrot, compiler of the Finnish National Epic Kalevala made his poem-collecting trips via Kuhmo to Karelia. Lönnrot made some of the editing in Kuhmo. Reconstruction of the hut where he has staying can be seen in the Kalevala village. Publishing Kalevala in 1835 fueled birth of Karelianism, which became a major trend in culture spheres towards the end of 19th century. Akseli Gallen-Kallela, who is considered one of the founders of Karelianism, spent his honeymoon in Kuhmo. During their stay Gallen-Kallela painted some of his works at Lapinsalmi, lake Lentua. Scenery to lake Lentua based the background of the middle picture in his work Aino triptych.

During the 19th century burn-beating was still essential in agriculture but in decline. At the end of 18th century tar production had arrived to the area as a new and steadily growing source of income. In the year 1900 tar production in Kuhmo was highest in Finland, at 1.6 million litres. Tar was shipped from Kuhmo to Oulu by rowboats. Largest boats could carry 25 – 27 barrels, 125 litres each. Remains of tar pits, where tar was distilled from pine, can be found everywhere in the Kuhmo area.

The village of Jonkeri and its surroundings near Lake Jonkeri were transferred from Nurmeksen maalaiskunta to Kuhmo in 1903.

The Winter War was an important event in the history of Kuhmo. During the war Kuhmo was bombarded 48 times and ground battles took place as near as ten kilometers from the center of the town. The Soviet army´s objective in Kuhmo was to proceed through Kuhmo and Kajaani to Oulu and divide Finland into two. The offensive was stopped on the Kuhmo – Saunajärvi road at Jyrkänkoski and on the Kuhmo – Kiekinkoski road at Tyrävaara, Both battlescenes are approximately 10 km from the city center. At narrow Kuhmo (Saunajärvi road) the Soviet 54th Division was forced to spread its troops which made Finnish guerilla tactics efficient. After being stopped, Soviet forces were divided and encircled into small pockets. A campaign to destroy the pockets and prevent the Soviet 44th Division from rescuing encircled forces continued until the Moscow peace treaty.  After the war Kuhmo kept its eastern borderline unchanged, thus having an unchanged borderline for 400 years straight since the Treaty of Teusina of 1595.

Geography 

By area the municipality is the second largest in the region (and the twelfth largest in the country), covering twice the land area of Luxembourg.  The population is heavily concentrated in Kuhmo-town.   Most of the area is very wild, featuring more than 600 lakes and for the rest extensively forested, providing a home to abundant wild life that includes brown bears, wolves and Finnish forest reindeer.

The Ministry of Agriculture and Forestry has set Kuhmo as a part of Eastern Finland´s stable bear population area. According to the plan, the population density of bears in this area will be maintained higher than in the rest of the country. The wolf population is also dense by comparison to the rest of the country. In consequence, the number of reindeer has decreased lately.

The topography is made up of low hills, of which the most significant are near the Russian frontier on the eastern side.   To the south, Kuhmo is bordered by North Karelia.

Several nature reserves have been founded in Kuhmo for the protection of the frontier wilderness.  Forest administration maintains several hiking routes on the reserves and almost all are accessible to the public.

Districts and villages 

Districts:

 Akonlahti
 Hankaranta
 Jaurakko
 Kalevala
 Kanninlampi
 Kantola
 Keitaala
 Kontio
 Korkeamäki
 Kuhmoniemi
 Levälahti
 Pajakka
 Piilola
 Saarikoski
 Sormula
 Suvanto

Villages:

 Haukela
 Hietaperä
 Härmänkylä
 Hukkajärvi
 Iivantiira
 Jonkeri
 Juonto
 Juttua
 Jyrkkä
 Jämäs
 Kalliojoki
 Katerma
 Kattilakoski
 Kiekinkoski
 Kivikiekki
 Korpisalmi
 Kuumu
 Kuusamonkylä
 Lammasperä
 Lauvuskylä
 Lentiira
 Lentua
 Niemiskylä
 Niva
 Saunajärvi
 Timoniemi
 Rasti
 Seilonen
 Sylväjä
 Vartius
 Vepsä
 Vieksi
 Viiksimo
 Vuosanka
 Ypykkävaara

Rimpi 
Rimpi is a former village near the Russian border, nowadays officially a part of Vartius. Traditionally inhabited by Karelian Orthodox Christians, Rimpi was one of three Karelian-speaking villages in Kainuu, the other two being Kuivajärvi and Hietajärvi in Suomussalmi. The village was destroyed in the Winter War and later rebuilt, however Finnish authorities did not allow the inhabitants to build Karelian-type houses. By the early 1980s, it no longer had permanent inhabitants. New people moved there permanently in 1991.

Rimpi was home to Eljas Ahtonen, who was the model for Väinämöinen in Akseli Gallen-Kallela's painting Aino-taru.

Culture
Kuhmo is well known for its Kuhmo Chamber Music Festival which is held annually. The festival was founded in 1970 by cellist Seppo Kimanen and a small group of friends. A book on this subject was published in 2006.

Sights

Kuhmo Arts Centre
Kalevala Village
Juminkeko – The Information Center for the Kalevala and Karelian Culture.
Petola Visitor Centre

Notable people
 Johan Gabriel Ståhlberg (1832–1873), Finnish priest and father of President K. J. Ståhlberg

International relations

Twin towns — Sister cities
Kuhmo is twinned with:
 Kostamus, Russia
 Oroszlány, Hungary
 Robertsfors, Sweden
 Šaľa, Slovakia

See also
 Kostomuksha
 Lieksa
 Reboly

References

External links

Kuhmo Chamber Music Festival
Many links and much information about Kuhmo's services.

 
Cities and towns in Finland
Municipalities of Kainuu
Populated places established in 1865